Kilbucho is a small settlement in the parish of Broughton, Glenholm and Kilbucho in the Scottish Borders area of Scotland in Peeblesshire and near Biggar and Broughton.

The name derives from the church which was dedicated to St Bega an Irish abbess. Several monasteries were dedicated to St Bega,  many in Cumbria including St Bees but also in Scotland at Kilbagie in Clackmannanshire and Kilbegie in Argyllshire. Near the church is St Bees well

The former parish of Kilbucho, now united in Broughton, Glenholm and Kilbucho, has an area of 6,710 acres. It forms a valley between Cardon Hill on the south and Hartree Hills on the north, however the land is mainly level with a very slight inclination towards Biggar Water.
Kilbucho is "fenced" in by hills on three sides, including some of the highest in southern Scotland east of Galloway. Coulter Fell is near here.

The manors of Kilbucho and Thriepland are mentioned in writs of 13th century.

The area is strongly connected with John Buchan, the author of The Thirty Nine Steps and former governor general of Canada. It is thought that the inspiration for his 1927 novel Witch Wood comes from this particular area.

See also
List of places in the Scottish Borders
List of places in Scotland

References

External links

RCAHMS: Kilbucho
CANMORE/RCAHMS: Kilbucho Old Manse
RCAHMS record for the Parish of Broughton, Glenholm and Kilbucho
RCAHMS: Bridge over the Kilbucho Burn
RCAHMS: Kilbucho, parish in Peeblesshire until 1794
GENUKI: Kilbucho
Vision of Britain: Broughton, Glenholm and Kilbucho, Peebles

Villages in the Scottish Borders
Peeblesshire
Parishes in Peeblesshire